Alyssa Ashley Reid (born March 15, 1993) is a Canadian singer-songwriter. Her career began in 2008 on The Next Star. She rose to fame in 2011, following the release of her single "Alone Again". From 2018-2020, she released music under the name ASHS.

Early life
Reid was born in Edmonton, Alberta, and raised in Brampton, Ontario. Her family moved around Canada often. Reid stated that it gave her the life experience she needed to enter the music industry. She is of Irish, Ukrainian and Greek heritage. She wrote her first song at the age of 7 and started vocal lessons at the age of 9. From then on, she has continued to develop her voice into what has become a singular vocal style. She went to St. Thomas Aquinas Catholic Performing Arts School from grades 9 to 11, and then attended Chinguacousy Secondary School through to graduation.

Career

2010–2011: Career beginnings and The Game 
Reid was soon discovered by writer, producer, and Wax Records co-founder Jamie Appleby, who signed her to his label after finding a parody of Justin Bieber's "One Less Lonely Girl" (titled "One Less Lonely Boy") that she had posted on YouTube, which went viral.

Her single "Alone Again" featuring P. Reign, released in November 2010, uses lyrics from Heart's 1987 hit "Alone", and was co-written with Wax Records label owner Jamie Appleby, with the original Heart writers Billy Steinberg and Tom Kelly. The song entered the Canadian Hot 100 at #79 for the week of January 1, 2011, and peaked at #11 the week of April 23, 2011. As of the week of September 24, 2011, the single has spent 39 weeks on the chart. It went on to be CRIA certified double platinum in Canada and sold over a million copies around the world.

In February 2011 she reached #1 on Billboard's "Canadian Emerging Artist" chart and held there for a record-breaking 33 weeks straight. Her single "The Game" was released on May 31, 2011, and entered the Canadian Hot 100 at #89 for the week of August 3, 2011, peaking at #35 as of the week of September 24, 2011. In February 2012, "Alone Again" achieved major success in the United Kingdom, where it peaked at number two on the UK Singles Chart, beaten to the summit by "Titanium" by David Guetta featuring Sia. On April 27, 2011, she performed her debut single "Alone Again" at Chester University, along with several other covers.

Reid was nominated for a 2011 MuchMusic Video Award for Pop Video of the Year for "Alone Again". Her first ever visit to the UK involved a series of interviews with BBC Radio One, Capital FM and a live interview with Fame Factor TV.

The Game was her debut studio album, recorded in 2010 and released on June 21, 2011, by Wax Records. Reid worked with composers and producers such as Billy Steinberg and Jamie Appleby. The album was released in the US as a digital download on May 7, 2013.

On July 20, 2011 Reid performed at The Baths Hall in Scunthorpe, England in the United Kingdom along with other acts for the Scunthorpe Telegraph's 75th Birthday and Lincs FM's 20th Birthday.

Reid performed at the 2012 Juno Awards on April 1, 2012, and was nominated in the "Best New Artist" category.

2011–2017: Touring, Time Bomb, Phoenix and singles 
On October 1, 2011, Reid began touring with Neverest for the Canadian Tour 2011. Reid started her first UK Tour in April 2012 by promoting her single "Alone Again". During this time, Reid was also featured on Wax Records label-mate Jesse Labelle's 2012 single "Heartbreak Coverup".

In September 2013, Reid released the single "Satisfaction Guaranteed", which rose to #25 on the Canadian Hot 100. On February 11, 2014, her second studio album Time Bomb was released. It featured "Hurricane" (released in the same year), and two other singles ("Running Guns" and "Satisfaction Guaranteed") that had been released a year earlier. Reid, along with Danny Fernandes and JRDN, joined Hedley on their Wild Live 2014 Canadian Tour, which began on February 14, 2014. Reid also toured across Canada alongside label-mate Virginia to Vegas for her "The Time Bomb Tour", which began October 16, 2014.

On July 10, 2015, Reid released a new single titled "Dangerous", featuring The Heist. She released "Tomorrow" on November 2 of the same year. Reid's third album Phoenix was released on November 27, 2015.

On June 6, 2016, Reid announced that her single "Rollercoaster" would be released on June 17, and will be featured on her upcoming fourth album. Said album has yet to materialise with the singles "The Badlands" and "High".

2018–present: ASHS

Reid took to Instagram on October 3, 2019, to announce that she has been releasing music under the alias ASHS. She also announced that will be working with Wax Records, the Universal Music Group, Republic Records and Polydor to bring ASHS to the "forefront of [her] my focus". As of October 2019, she has released two extended plays under the ASHS alias: 3AM Pt. 1 and 3AM Pt. 2. She has also released four singles, "Without You", "Paranoid", "My Ex" and "Don't Call Me", under Universal Music Canada.

Personal life

She attended University of Toronto, majoring in Environmental Studies. After that, she worked with various artists in Sweden, Los Angeles and Toronto as a songwriter and creative director. Reid currently plays rugby for the Toronto Scottish R.F.C.

Discography

Studio albums

Extended plays

Singles

As lead artist

As featured artist

Christmas singles

Awards and nominations

See also 
 The Next Star

References

Notes

External links 

 
 An Interview with Alyssa Reid

1993 births
Living people
21st-century Canadian women singers
3 Beat Records artists
Canadian women pop singers
Canadian women singer-songwriters
Canadian hip hop singers
Canadian women guitarists
Canadian women pianists
Musicians from Brampton
Musicians from Edmonton
Polydor Records artists
Republic Records artists
Ultra Records artists
21st-century women pianists